Stefen Reid (born May 11, 1972) is a former Canadian football linebacker who played eight seasons in the Canadian Football League with the Ottawa Rough Riders and Montreal Alouettes. He was drafted by the Ottawa Rough Riders in the bonus round of the 1995 CFL Draft. He played college football at Boise State University.

Professional career

Ottawa Rough Riders
Reid was drafted by the Ottawa Rough Riders in the bonus round of the 1995 CFL Draft.

Montreal Alouettes
Reid was traded to the Montreal Alouettes for Stephen Bates. He was named an East Division All-Star in 2002. Reid played in the 88th Grey Cup, losing to the BC Lions in 2002, and 90th Grey Cup, winning against the Edmonton Eskimos in 2002. He retired in May 2003.

References

External links
Just Sports Stats

Living people
1972 births
Players of Canadian football from British Columbia
Canadian football linebackers
Boise State Broncos football players
Ottawa Rough Riders players
Montreal Alouettes players
People from the Thompson-Nicola Regional District